The 2019–20 MSV Duisburg season was the 120th season in the club's football history. In 2019–20 the club played in the 3. Liga, the third tier of German football.

Due to the COVID-19 pandemic in Germany, the matchdays 28 and 29 were postponed and would be rescheduled. On 16 March, the DFB announced that the league would be suspended until 30 April. On 21 May, the DFB announced that the season would be continued on 30 May.

Team

Transfers

In

Out

New contracts

Friendlies

Competitions
Times from 1 July to 27 October 2019 and from 30 March to 30 June 2020 are UTC+2, from 28 October 2019 to 29 March 2020 UTC+1.

Overview

3. Liga

League table

Results summary

Result round by round

Matches

DFB-Pokal

Lower Rhine Cup

Statistics

Squad statistics

† Players who left the club mid-season.

Goals

Clean sheets

Disciplinary record

Notes

References

External links

German football clubs 2019–20 season
MSV Duisburg seasons